State Highway 78 is  long (97 km) state highway in southern Oklahoma. It runs from the Red River (where it crosses into Texas as State Highway 78) to Tishomingo. It has no lettered spur routes.

Route description

State Highway 78 enters Oklahoma across the Red River on the State Highway No. 78 Bridge at the Red River, near the unincorporated community of Karma. Near Yuba, SH-78 curves west to head toward Achille, where it meets State Highway 91. It curves back north here, meets State Highway 70E, and then passes through the east part of Durant, where it crosses US-70. In northern Durant, SH-78 has an interchange with the US-69/75 freeway.

Three miles north of US-69/75, SH-78 turns west to head through Cobb and Brown before turning north to meet State Highway 199. It meets SH-22 for the first time at Nida. It then passes through Emet and turns back west at Milburn. It then meets SH-22 for a second time three miles (5 km) east of Tishomingo. It then joins SH-22 into Tishomingo, where it ends at US-377/SH-99.

History
The road that would become SH-78 was originally commissioned as SH-299 on November 22, 1938. SH-299 was renumbered to SH-78 in its entirety in 1955, most likely to match the route number of TX-78.

Previous Routes
SH-78 was originally designated as a route from Boise City to the Texas Border. This route became US 385 in 1955.

Junction list

References

External links
SH-78 at Roadklahoma

078
Transportation in Bryan County, Oklahoma
Transportation in Johnston County, Oklahoma